The Bahujan Mukti Party (BMP) is a political party in India launched on 6 December 2012. Pravendra Pratap Singh is National President Bahujan Mukti Party.

Merger proposal with  Loktantrik Janata Dal
A merger with Loktantrik Janata Dal (founded on 6 December 2012) was proposed but was called off and was set up as a political wing of All India Backward (SC, ST, OBC) and Minority Communities Employees' Federation (BAMCEF). Pravendra Pratap Singh is the current President of the Bahujan Mukti party.

Bihar elections 2020
As of 2020, the party was preparing for the 2020 Bihar Legislative Assembly election for which it formed alliance with former MP Pappu Yadav, Chief of Bhim Army and Azad Samaj Party, Chandrashekhar Azad Ravan to form Progressive Democratic Alliance, but failed to secure any seat.

Uttar Pradesh election 2022
Considered a smaller party in the 2022 Uttar Pradesh Legislative Assembly election, the Bahujan Mukti Party has fielded its candidates in some areas including the Mahoba and the Auraiya.

References

Political parties established in 2012
Political parties in India
Dalit politics
2012 establishments in India